Sergio Gobbi (born 13 May 1938 in Milan, Italy), born as Sergio Ehrlich, is an Italian-French filmmaker, who was married to Jocelyn Wildenstein.

Selected filmography
 The Heist (1970)
 Love Me Strangely (1971)
 The Pebbles of Etretat (1972)
  (1973)
 Blondy (1976)
 Enfantasme (1978)
 Asphalt Warriors (1984)

References

External links

Italian film directors
1938 births
Living people
Film people from Milan